Tender Is the Night is a 1962 American film directed by Henry King and starring Jennifer Jones and Jason Robards, Jr. King's last film, it is based on the 1934 novel of the same name by F. Scott Fitzgerald.

The soundtrack featured a song, also called "Tender Is the Night", by Sammy Fain (music) and Paul Francis Webster (lyrics), which was nominated for the 1962 Academy Award for Best Song. Robards won the 1962 NBR Award for his performances in Tender Is the Night and Long Day's Journey Into Night.

King's previous film had been Beloved Infidel, a biographical drama about Fitzgerald, author of Tender Is the Night.

There are interesting backstage anecdotes about pre-production in Memo from David O. Selznick, an edited collection of the iconic producer's letters and notes.  Selznick's then-wife was sought and cast as the film's lead, and his letters reflect insight into the casting process (Jane Fonda had wanted to play Rosemary; William Holden, Henry Fonda and Christopher Plummer were considered for Dick), the creative angst around the project, and Selznick's own clever insights into the source novel and its requirements to become a successful film property.

Plot summary
"The French Riviera _ _ in the Twenties": while at a party in the south of France, Nicole Diver, a woman with many emotional issues, sees her husband, Dr. Dick Diver, take an interest in an American movie starlet, Rosemary Hoyt. Jealousy gets the better of Nicole.

The story flashes back to how Dick and Nicole met. He was a distinguished psychiatrist who made the classic mistake of falling in love with a patient, Nicole Warren. He marries her despite warnings from his mentor, Dr. Dohmler, that it will ruin Dick's career.

Dick spends the next years of his life abandoning his work to indulge wife Nicole's many whims, leading a hedonistic life, paid for by Nicole's sophisticated sister, Baby. By the time he realizes the error of his ways and attempts to resume his career, it is Nicole who has found a new lover, and she wants a divorce.

Cast

Soundtracks
The film score was composed by Bernard Herrmann. Soundtracks included the main theme "Tender Is the Night" composed by Sammy Fain with lyrics by Paul Francis Webster (above). This song was played in the film by pianist George Greeley (uncredited). Other songs were:
 "Five Foot Two, Eyes of Blue" (Has Anybody Seen My Girl?), composed by Ray Henderson, lyrics by Sam Lewis and Joe Young
 "Charleston", composed by James P. Johnson
 "Auld Lang Syne", traditional music: lyrics by Robert Burns, lyrics by Andreas Frege
 "Honey", music by Richard A. Whiting, lyrics by Seymour Simons & Haven Gillespie
 "Jeannine, I Dream of Lilac Time", composed by Nathaniel Shilkret, lyrics by L. Wolfe Gilbert
 "I Love You", composed by Harry Archer
 "How Am I To Know", composed by Jack King, lyrics by Dorothy Parker
  (I've Grown So Lonesome) "Thinking of You" composed by Walter Donaldson and Paul Ash
 "I Never Knew" composed by Tom Pitts, Raymond B. Egan and Roy Marsh
 "Charmaine" composed by Erno Rapee, lyrics by Lew Pollack

Reception
Variety wrote the following:A combination of attractive, intelligent performances and consistently interesting, De Luxecolorful photography of interiors and exteriors – mostly the French Riviera – provide big plus qualities in this 20th-Fox adaptation of Tender Is The Night. This may not be a 100 proof distillation of F. Scott Fitzgerald. But Tender Is The Night is nonetheless on its own filmic terms a thoughtful, disturbing and at times absorbing romantic drama...<p>Jones emerges a crisply fresh, intriguing personality and creates a striking character as the schizophrenic Nicole. Robards, whose non-matinee-idol masculinity makes him an ideal choice for the role of the ill-fated doctor-husband, Dick Diver, plays with intelligence and conviction. Joan Fontaine is convincing as Nicole’s shallow, older sister, performing with the right manifestation of frivolity and bite that her part requires.

See also
 List of American films of 1962

References

External links

1962 films
20th Century Fox films
CinemaScope films
Films based on works by F. Scott Fitzgerald
Films directed by Henry King
Films scored by Bernard Herrmann
Films set in the Roaring Twenties
1962 drama films
Films based on American novels
American drama films
Films set on the French Riviera
Films set in Rome
Films set in Zürich
1960s English-language films
1960s American films